Odd Bye (27 February 1916 – 26 May 2010) was a Norwegian politician for the Centre Party.

Bye came from Horg in Sør-Trøndelag. From 1945 he worked as a journalist in different newspapers including Nationen and Dagbladet Rogaland. He also became the chief editor of the Centre Party press office when it was started in 1945 and held 1965. During Borten's Cabinet from 1965 to 1971 Bye held the position as State Secretary at the Office of the Prime Minister.

After the Borten cabinet resigned in 1971 Bye returned to his job as chief editor and continued in that job  until he retired in 1984. Bye died on 26 May 2010, 94 years old.

References

1916 births
2010 deaths
People from Melhus
Centre Party (Norway) politicians
Norwegian state secretaries
Norwegian journalists